Amason Kingi Jeffah  is a Kenyan politician currently serving as the Speaker of the Senate of Kenya. He is a member of the Pamoja African Alliance party, which he founded, and the Kenya Kwanza alliance. He served as the first governor of Kilifi County from 2013 to 2022, having been elected twice to the position.

He formed his own party, Pamoja African Alliance which later joined the United Democratic Alliance, FORD–Kenya, the Amani National Congress and other small parties to form the Kenya Kwanza alliance, which was elected into government in the 2022 Kenyan general election.

Career 
Kingi studied law and graduated from the University of Nairobi in 1998. As a member of the Orange Democratic Movement (ODM), he was elected to represent the Magarini Constituency in parliament during the 2007 Kenyan parliamentary election.

His growing reputation was spotted by president Mwai Kibaki and prime minister Raila Odinga, who gave him a position as Minister for the East African Community in the Grand Coalition government that was formed after the 2007 post-election violence. He served as Minister for Fisheries Development from 2010 to 2013.

Kingi ran for and won the governorship of Kilifi County in 2013, and he was reelected in 2017. He established the Pamoja African Alliance party in an effort to free coastal Kenya from ODM's control. This party originally aligned itself with Azimio la Umoja, which supported Raila Odinga for president, but severed relations with the group in 2022 and joined Kenya Kwanza, which supported William Ruto. Kenya Kwanza and Ruto won the 2022 elections, and Kingi was elected Speaker of the Senate.

References

Living people
County Governors of Kenya
Year of birth missing (living people)
Orange Democratic Movement politicians
Members of the National Assembly (Kenya)
People from Coast Province
Leaders of political parties in Kenya
Members of the 10th Parliament of Kenya
21st-century Kenyan politicians